Eberstadt is a municipality in Baden-Württemberg, Germany

Eberstadt may also refer to:

Places
 a borough in Darmstadt-Eberstadt, Germany
 a borough in Buchen, Germany
 Eberstedt, a municipality in Thuringia, Germany

Persons
 Otto Eberstadt, a strongman and circus performer
 a member of the Eberstadt-Kahn family:
 Ferdinand Eberstadt (mayor)
 , economist and urban planner
 Otto Hermann Kahn, investment banker and philanthropist
 Roger Wolfe Kahn, musician and composer

 a member of the Eberstadt-Nash family:
 Ferdinand Eberstadt (policy advisor), lawyer, investment banker and policy advisor
 Ogden Nash, poet
 Frederick Eberstadt, photographer and father of Fernanda Eberstadt and Nicholas Eberstadt
 Esther Eberstadt Brooke
 Fernanda Eberstadt, writer
 Nicholas Eberstadt, demographer and political economist
 Mary Eberstadt, writer

Other
 Eberstadt Report